Julie Brendengen Jensen (born 15 March 1990) is a Norwegian freestyle skier. She represented Norway at the 2010 Winter Olympics in Vancouver, where she placed 8th in the Women's ski cross.

References

External links

1990 births
Sportspeople from Bærum
Norwegian female freestyle skiers
Olympic freestyle skiers of Norway
Freestyle skiers at the 2010 Winter Olympics
Living people
21st-century Norwegian women